John A. O'Keefe is a former judge of the Federal Court of Canada.

References

Living people
Judges of the Federal Court of Canada
Year of birth missing (living people)